The 2005 CAF Confederation Cup was the second edition of the CAF Confederation Cup. It started with the preliminary round (home-and away ties) that was played in January and February 2005. FAR Rabat of Morocco beat Dolphins F.C. of Nigeria in the final.

Qualifying rounds

Preliminary round
1st legs played 30 January 2005 and 2nd legs played 13 February 2005.

|}

Notes

First round
1st legs played 5 March 2005 and 2nd legs played 19 March 2005.

|}

Second round
1st legs played 8–11 April 2005 and 2nd legs played 23-24 April 2005.

|}

Notes

Play-off round
In this round, the 8 winners of the round of 16 play the losers of the round of 16 of the Champions League for 8 places in the group stage.
1st legs played May 6–8, 2005 and 2nd legs played May 21–23, 2005.

|}

Notes

Group stage

Group A

Group B

Knockout stage

Final

The 1st leg was played on November 6 and the 2nd leg on November 19.

Top goal scorers

The top scorers from the 2005 CAF Confederation Cup are as follows. Eric Gawu/Khalid El Hirech/Kelechi Osunwa

External links
Confederation Cup 2005 - rsssf.com

 
CAF Confederation Cup
2